Gabriel Boakye (born February 26, 1998) is a Canadian soccer player who plays as a forward.

Club career

Toronto FC II
Boakye began playing soccer at the age of eight for Oakridges SC. In 2015, he joined TFC Academy in the Premier Development League and Toronto FC II in the United Soccer League and made thirteen and eight appearances respectively. On July 9, 2015, Boakye made his professional debut in a 2–0 defeat to Pittsburgh Riverhounds. He suffered a further six defeats, claiming only one victory in his time with the club. His final appearance came on September 17 in a 2–1 loss to Richmond Kickers. In November 2015, Boakye was one of two Toronto FC players for Under-17 Men's Player of the Year at the 2015 Canada Soccer Player Awards. The award was won by Vancouver Whitecap's Kadin Chung.

Energie Cottbus
Boakye moved to Energie Cottbus in 2016, largely playing with the U-19 team. He made his first substitute appearance for the first team in December 2016. While at Energie Cottbus, Boakye would switch from a fullback, to a forward, earning positive review in the process as he scored 4 goals in 17 games while the club earned promotion to the 3. Liga.

1. FC Köln II
After two seasons with Energie Cottbus, Boakye signed with 1. FC Köln II.

Lokomotive Leipzig 
On July 25, 2020, Boakye signed a one-year contract with FC Lokomotive Leipzig.

FC Edmonton
On September 23, 2021, he joined FC Edmonton in the Canadian Premier League for the remainder of the 2021 season. On February 9, 2022, the club announced that Boakye and all but two other players would not be returning for the 2022 season.

International career
Boakye featured in the Canadian youth program for the first time in 2013 under coach Tony Fonseca. He was named to the U15 national team for the 2013 Copa de México de Naciones. He made his international debut during the CONCACAF Under-17 Championship. On February 28, 2015, he played 90 minutes a 3–1 victory over Haiti. He then followed up with a further four international appearances over the next few weeks. His final outing came on March 15, when suffering a 3–0 defeat to Costa Rica. In February 2017, Boakye was named to Canada's roster for the 2017 CONCACAF U-20 Championship Boakye was named to the Canadian U-23 provisional roster for the 2020 CONCACAF Men's Olympic Qualifying Championship on February 26, 2020.

Personal life
Boakye's father was born in Kumasi, Ghana, while his mother was born in Accra, Ghana. As a result, he is eligible to represent Canada or Ghana.

References

External links
 
 

1998 births
Living people
Association football forwards
Canadian soccer players
Canada men's youth international soccer players
Canadian people of Ghanaian descent
Canadian expatriate soccer players
Expatriate footballers in Germany
Canadian expatriate sportspeople in Germany
Toronto FC players
Toronto FC II players
FC Energie Cottbus players
1. FC Köln II players
1. FC Lokomotive Leipzig players
FC Edmonton players
USL Championship players
Regionalliga players
Canadian Premier League players